Beesly is a surname. Notable people with the surname include: 
Edward Spencer Beesly (1831–1915), English positivist and historian
Richard Beesly (1907–1965), British rower who won an Olympic gold medal at the 1928 Summer Olympics
Patrick Beesly (1913–1986), British author and intelligence officer during World War II
Pam Beesly, a fictional character on the U.S. television sitcom The Office, played by Jenna Fischer

See also
Beazley
Besley, a surname
Beasley
Beesley